Raipur Municipal Corporation or RMC is the Municipal Corporation responsible for the governing civic infrastructure and administration of the city of Raipur, largest & capital city of Chhattisgarh. Raipur Municipal Corporation has been formed with functions to improve the infrastructure of town. This civic administrative body administers the city's cleanliness and other public services like public health, clean streets and parks. It has ranked 7th in Municipal Performance Index 2020 by Union Ministry of Housing and Urban Affairs (MoHUA)

History 
RMC was established in the early 1890s by Colonial Government. The details of Mayors & elections until 1980 are still unknown. The Cabinet of Arjun Singh, that time Chief Minister of United Madhya Pradesh upgraded RMC to Nagar Palik Nigam. The first elections for 63 wards of RMC was held in the same year where INC's Swaroop Chand Jain became the first mayor of the City. Between 1985 to 1995, the Municipal Corporation was controlled under the Raipur Administrator or District Magistrate appointed by Chief Minister. After the Madhya Pradesh Reorganisation Act, 2000 was passed by the Parliament of India, it became a part  of Chhattisgarh and also the largest Municipal Corporation of the state. Tarun Prasad Chatterjee was the first the mayor of the city after creation of the Chhattisgarh. In 2004 before local elections, The Raman Singh Cabinet approved the creation of 7 more wards for RMC and the number increased from 63 to 70. First local body elections after formation of state was held in 2004 where BJP's Sunil Soni (Current MP of Raipur Loksabha) became the first and till date non-congress mayor of Raipur. There have been 11 election held between 1930 to present and in most INC was successful. Current Mayor of the city is Aijaz Dhebar.

Administration 
RMC is headed by Mayor (Head of Nigam) which has elected by people and an IAS officer who serves as Municipal Commissioner elected by CM of state. Like other election in India, in RMC also the Parsahads (elected reprensentatives of wards) forms the Nigam and the elected leader of the majority party becomes Mayor.

2019-20 Raipur Urban Body Elections 
2019-20 Raipur Urban Body Elections is the most current election held in Raipur which was held between December 2019 - January 2020.

Polling 
The Election Commission of Chhattisgarh declared The polling day for all 70 seats was held on 22 December 2019 and counting day on 24 December 2019. There was 78% overall voting percentage.

Results 
The Results were declared on 24 December 2019 in which INC became the largest party with 34 seats followed by BJP with 29 Seats, Independent Politicians with 5 seats and JCC(J)+ got 2 seats. The Majority for making government is 36 and INC wants only two parshads which was fulfilled by support of 5 Independent Politicians. The incumbdent mayor Pramod Dubey was elected as Chairman on 5 January 2020 or Speaker and Aijaz Dhebhar was elected as 10th Mayor of RMC by voting of Parshads on 7 January 2020 and both took oath on the same day of their election.

List of Mayors

References

Raipur, Chhattisgarh
Municipal corporations in Chhattisgarh